Homebush may refer to:

In Australia

New South Wales 
 Homebush, New South Wales, a suburb of Sydney
 Homebush West, a suburb of Sydney
 Sydney Olympic Park, a suburb of Sydney formerly called Homebush Bay
 Penarie, New South Wales, a locality in south-western New South Wales formerly called Homebush.

Queensland 
 Homebush, Queensland, a locality in the Mackay Region

Victoria 
 Homebush, Victoria

In New Zealand
 Homebush, New Zealand, in Selwyn District, Canterbury
 Homebush, Masterton